K-129 was a  state highway in the U.S. state of Kansas. K-129's southern terminus was at K-154 in Dodge City and the northern terminus was at U.S. Route 56 (US-56), US-283 and US-50 Business (US-50 Bus.) in Dodge City.

K-129 was first designated as a state highway in 1980, replacing US-154 Spur. Then in 1994, when US-400 was created, K-129 was decommissioned and became a part of a newly rerouted US-56, US-283 and US-400.

Route description 
K-129 began at K-154 and started travelling north, and soon intersected Lariat Drive. It continued north for a short distance, crossed the railroad tracks, then reached its northern terminus at US-56, US-283 and US-50 Business.

The Kansas Department of Transportation (KDOT) tracks the traffic levels on its highways, and in 1995, they determined that on average the traffic was 6420 vehicles on K-129.

History
The highway that became K-129 was first designated as US-154 Spur in a December 22, 1948 resolution. In an August 12, 1980 resolution, U.S. 154 Spur was decommissioned and became K-129. In a December 5, 1994 resolution, it was planned to decommission K-129 and make it a part of a newly rerouted US-56, US-283 and US-400, once other parts of US-400 wer built. Then by 1996, K-129 had been decommissioned and became part of the new alignment of US-56, US-283 and US-400.

Major intersections

References

External links

Kansas Department of Transportation State Map
KDOT: Historic State Maps

129
U.S. Route 56